John Mustard Merriman (June 15, 1946 – May 22, 2022) was an American historian specializing in modern French history. He was a Charles Seymour Professor of History at Yale University.

Early life and education
Merriman was born on June 15, 1946, in Battle Creek, Michigan. His mother, Sally Mustard, was a portrait and landscape painter. He did not know his father, Robert Merriman, who was divorced from his mother when John was 2. He grew up in Portland, Oregon, where he attended a Jesuit all-boys secondary school, although he did not consider himself religious. He attended the University of Michigan, where he obtained his B.A. in History in 1968 and Ph.D. in 1972, under Charles Tilly, and gained a life-long passion for French culture and history.

Career
Merriman formed many of his political views during the volatile Vietnam years; he described himself as "virulently anti-establishment" and his favorite musicians The Rolling Stones, iconic of the counterculture of the 1960s, influenced his writing habits, "[I've] never written a thing without a record on." He became "a practitioner of history from the ground up", sometimes called microhistory, that came into vogue during the 1970s.

His books include The Dynamite Club: How a Bombing in the Fin-De-Siecle Paris Ignited the Age of Modern Terror (2009) about the French Anarchist Emile Henry (1872–1894), Massacre: The Life and Death of the Paris Commune (2014) focusing on the Paris Commune of 1871, particularly on "The Bloody Week"; and Ballad of the Anarchist Bandits: The Crime Spree that Gripped Belle Epoque Paris (2017) a story of the Bonnot Gang. "John Merriman became our greatest historian of the French left and its repression, of the Communards, the Anarchists, and the French police", according to historian Alice Kaplan. He also authored A History of Modern Europe since the Renaissance (1996 & 2002), a survey text for undergraduate history classes, it has been used by over a quarter million students. According to historian Peter McPhee, "His books are characterized by a quite extraordinary knowledge of place: no other French historian—and only a handful of French historians—has had such a rich understanding of the diversity of French cities." 

Merriman taught French and Modern European history and first began teaching at Yale as an assistant professor in 1973, and taught there until his death. 

In 2017, the American Historical Association gave Merriman the Lifetime Achievement Award for Scholarly Distinction. He was popular with students, he received two undergraduate teaching awards from Yale, the Harwood F. Byrnes-Richard B. Sewall Prize for Teaching Excellence in 2000, and the Phi Beta Kappa Devane Medal for excellence in teaching and scholarship in 2019. Students remembered how he used his storytelling skills to animate his lectures, "He'd walk in with a few crumpled pieces of paper, walk back and forth, jump from one subject to another, and after two or three hours you’d really gotten somewhere," said former student and later history professor Judith Coffin. Author Ta-Nehisi Coates, who watched his lectures online, described his style as like a "freestyle rapper" who riffed off his material and "had this weird ability to inhabit the history."

He was the seventh master of Branford College (1983–1991).

Personal life
In 1980, he married Carol Virginia Payne. They had two children, Laura and Christopher. His wife died in 2016. He lived part of each year with his family in Balazuc, in southern France. He wrote a history of the medieval village, The Stones of Balazuc: A French Village in Time (2002).  Merriman died from complications of bladder cancer and multiple myeloma in New Haven, Connecticut on May 22, 2022, at the age of 75.

Published works

Books
 
 
 
 
  available in French as

Edited books
 
 
 
 
 
 
  and

Lectures
 (Video) HIST 276: France Since 1871 (Fall 2007), by John Merriman at Open Yale Courses.
 (Video) HIST 202: European Civilization, 1648–1945 (Fall 2008), by John Merriman at Open Yale Courses.

References

External links
 John Merriman—Yale faculty page
 

1946 births
2022 deaths
Deaths from multiple myeloma
Deaths from bladder cancer
20th-century American historians
21st-century American historians
Historians of anarchism
Historians of Europe
Historians of France
University of Michigan alumni
Yale University faculty